Tatarikha is a rural locality (a village) in Kemskoye Rural Settlement, Vytegorsky District, Vologda Oblast, Russia. The population was 11 as of 2002.

Geography 
Tatarikha is located 83 km southeast of Vytegra (the district's administrative centre) by road. Prokshino is the nearest  locality.

References 

Rural localities in Vytegorsky District